Sam MacKechnie (5 June 1897 – 23 November 1960) was  a former Australian rules footballer who played with Collingwood in the Victorian Football League (VFL).

Notes

External links 

		
Sam MacKechnie's profile at Collingwood Forever

1897 births
1960 deaths
Australian rules footballers from Victoria (Australia)
Collingwood Football Club players